Vahakulmu is a village in Tapa Parish, Lääne-Viru County, in northeastern Estonia. It lies on the Valgejõgi River, where an impounded lake and ruins of watermill are situated.

Gallery

References

 

Villages in Lääne-Viru County